Stuart Charles Rattle (16 November 1960-4 December 2013) was an Australian interior designer who was murdered by Michael Anthony O’Neill, his partner of 16 years, in their South Yarra home following an argument.

Background
Rattle was the owner of Stuart Rattle Interior Design in Melbourne, a high-end interior design firm that catered to an affluent clientele. His work appeared in magazines such as Belle and on television programs such as Gardening Australia.

O’Neill, originally from Ireland, was working as a waiter at an Italian bistro when he met Rattle in the 1990s. O’Neill began working for Rattle’s firm, where his responsibilities included accounting, quoting, invoicing and ordering stock for clients.

Murder
On 4 December 2013, O’Neill struck Rattle with a frying pan and then strangled him with a dog lead after an argument. O’Neill pretended for the next five days that Rattle was still alive, sending text messages from Rattle's phone and telling friends Rattle was unwell. He then burned down with the home and attempted to make it appear to be an accident involving candles. O’Neill confessed to killing Rattle when police found inconsistencies in his account of what happened.

Trial
O’Neill pleaded guilty to one count of murder and one count of arson. He was diagnosed with ‘dependent personality disorder with prominent features of narcissistic personality disorder’, which defense council argued was a mitigating factor. O’Neill was sentenced to 18 years in prison with a non- parole period of 13 years.

Rattle’s estate, worth one million dollars, was given to his parents after the court deemed O’Neill, the beneficiary of Rattle’s will, ineligible to benefit.

Books
The murder was the subject of the book Smoke and Mirrors by Robin Bowles.

Rattle’s home was profiled in the book Stuart Rattle’s Musk Farm, featuring a foreword by Paul Bangay.

A tribute to Rattle appeared in Vogue Australia.

References

2013 murders in Australia
Crime in Victoria (Australia)
Deaths by person in Australia
Deaths by strangulation
Murder in Melbourne
Violence against gay men
Violence against LGBT people